Iris Evelina Margery Brooke, later Iris Giffard (1905 – post 1967), was a British artist, author and book illustrator who, throughout her career, concentrated on exploring the history of costume.

Biography
Brooke was born at Ryde on the Isle of Wight in January 1905 and attended Bruntsfield High School on the island. From 1923 to 1926 she studied at the Croydon School of Art and then at the Royal College of Art in London until 1929, where her teachers included Randolph Schwabe. Throughout her subsequent career, Brooke created portraits in both oil and chalk but mainly concentrated on writing and illustrating books on historical costumes and fashion. She also wrote articles for a number of journals and was elected a member of the Women's Press Club. In 1944 Brooke married William Hugh Giffard and the couple settled near Honiton in Devon.

Books illustrated
 English Costume of the Nineteenth Century, 1929, by James Laver
 English Costume of the Eighteenth Century, 1931, by James Laver
 A Pageant of Kings and Queens, 1937, by Constance Mary Matthews & Charles Carrington
 Arpies and Sirens, 1942, by Susan Knowles.

Books written and illustrated
 English Children's Costume Since 1775, 1930
 English Costume in the Age of Elizabeth, 1933
 English Costume of the Seventeenth Century, 1934
 English Costume of the Early Middle Ages, 1936
 A History of English Costume, 1937
 Western Europe costume and its relation to the theatre, 1939
 English Costume 1900–50, 1951
 Four Walls Adorned: Interior Decoration 1485–1820, 1952
 Pleasures of the Past, 1955
 English Costume of the Later Middle Ages, 1956
 Dress and Undress, 1958
 English Children's Costume Since 1775, 1958
 Costume in Greek Classic Drama, 1962
 Western European Costume and Its Relation to the Theatre, 1963
 Medieval Theatre Costume, 1967.

References

1905 births
Date of death missing
20th-century English painters
20th-century English women artists
20th-century English women writers
Alumni of the Royal College of Art
Alumni of Croydon College
Artists from the Isle of Wight
British women illustrators
English illustrators
People from Ryde
Writers who illustrated their own writing